Redbank Gorge (commonly Red Bank Gorge), is a gorge located in the Northern Territory of Australia, 156 km west of Alice Springs. It is situated at the bottom of Mount Sonder.

Features 
The area features camping facilities at the Woodland and Ridgetop campgrounds, which contain amenities such as a toilet and fire pit, however fees apply to use these locations.
The gorges can be accessed from the nearby Larapinta and Namatjira drives.

References

External links 
 Northern Territory fact sheet

Canyons and gorges in the Northern Territory